Consort Ning (died 25 June 1734), of the Han Chinese Bordered Yellow Banner Wu clan, was a consort of the Yongzheng Emperor.

Life

Family background 
Consort Ning was a member of the Han Chinese Bordered Yellow Banner Wu clan. It was said that the Wu clan descended from the Ming dynasty. Her personal name was Lingyuan (令媛). The family came from Shanxi.

 Father: Wu Zhuguo (武柱国), served as magistrate of Taizhou.

 Elder brother: Wu Qixin (武启欣)

Yongzheng era 
In 1733, Lady Wu entered the Forbidden City after the Elegant Women selection, and was given the title of "Concubine Ning" (宁嫔; "ning" meaning "calm", "tranquil"). The selection was set in the third lunar month, unlike in previous years, when it was set in twelfth lunar month. In 1734, she was supposed to be promoted to Consort Ning (宁妃). Lady Wu died before the promotion ceremony and was given a funeral befitting a consort. Her funeral ceremony was similar to the funeral of the Kangxi Emperor's Consort Liang. After her death, her eldest brother, Wu Qixin, was relocated to the capital, and was permitted to preserve Consort Ning's belongings, including two satin bed covers with spring flowers ornament, one pillow and three satin sheets.    

Consort Ning's coffin was interred in the Tai Mausoleum in the Western Qing tombs.

Titles 
 During the reign of the Yongzheng Emperor (r. 1722–1735):
 Concubine Ning (from 1733), fifth rank consort
 Consort Ning (from 1735), fourth rank consort

In fiction and popular culture 
 Portrayed by Rayzha Alimjan in the 2011 TV series Empresses in the Palace as Ye Lanyi, Concubine Ning (叶澜依).
 Portrayed by Sun Xi in the 2016 movie "Fragrance of the beauty" (美人香) as Wu Ci'en, Noble Lady Ning (武慈恩).

See also
 Ranks of imperial consorts in China#Qing
 Royal and noble ranks of the Qing dynasty

References 

Consorts of the Yongzheng Emperor
1734 deaths
Year of birth unknown